Fernand, Count van de Werve, (9 June 1876 – 29 December 1958) was a Belgian nobleman.

Family 
He was the son of Léon van de Werve (1851-1920) and  Irène Kervyn d'Oud Mooreghem (1857-1938). His uncle was René-Philippe van de Werve. He was married to Countess Blanche de Lichtervelde, daughter of Count Gaston-Auguste of Lichtervelde and Baronness Marguerite Fallon.

Children:
 Antoinette van de Werve de Vorsselaer b. 16.12.1911
 Denise van de Werve de Vorsselaer b. 30.01.1913
 Married: Maxime van de Werve de Schilde
 Jacques van de Werve de Vorsselaer b. 01.10.1915
 Married: Béatrice de Faestraets
 Léon van de Werve de Vorsselaer b. 14.10.1919

References

1876 births
1958 deaths
Counts of Belgium
Fernand